Lebanon is a historic plantation house located near Dunn, Harnett County, North Carolina. It was built about 1824, and is a two-story, three bay, Greek Revival style frame dwelling with a one-story wing. It is sheathed in weatherboard and rests on a brick foundation. The front facade features a three bay, two-tier porch. During the American Civil War, the Battle of Averasboro (March 16, 1865) occurred in the immediate vicinity of plantation house and it was used as a hospital.

It was listed on the National Register of Historic Places in 1973.

References

Plantation houses in North Carolina
American Civil War hospitals
Houses on the National Register of Historic Places in North Carolina
Greek Revival houses in North Carolina
Houses completed in 1824
Houses in Harnett County, North Carolina
National Register of Historic Places in Harnett County, North Carolina